Rezvovo is a rural locality (a village) in Akberdinsky Selsoviet, Iglinsky District, Bashkortostan, Russia. The population was 28 as of 2010. There are 4 streets.

Geography 
Rezvovo is located 44 km south of Iglino (the district's administrative centre) by road. Urunda is the nearest rural locality.

References 

Rural localities in Iglinsky District